Ukraine has been estimated to possess natural gas reserves of over 1 trillion cubic meters, and in 2018 was ranked 26th among countries with proved reserves of natural gas. Its total gas reserves have been estimated at 5.4 trillion cubic meters. In 2021, Ukraine produced 19.8 billion cubic meters (bcm or Gm3) of natural gas. To satisfy domestic demand of 27.3 bcm that year, Ukraine relied on gas imports (2.6 bcm) and withdrawal from underground storage (4.9 bcm). Winter demand can reach 150 mcm per day. To meet domestic demand, Ukraine plans to increase domestic natural gas output to 27 bcm.

During Soviet times, Ukraine produced a record of 68.7 bcm in 1976. At the time of independence in 1991, production was at 26.6 bcm, and fell in the 1990s to about 18 bcm. Since the mid-2000s, production has stabilised between 20 and 21 bcm. According to a report issued by the OECD, over 70% of domestic gas production is extracted by UkrGasVydobuvannya, a subsidiary of the state-owned company Naftogaz. Private gas production companies in Ukraine are DTEK Oil&Gas, Ukrnaftoburinnya, Burisma, Smart Energy, Poltava Petroleum Company, Geo Alliance Group, and KUB-GAS.

Ukraine stopped buying gas from Russia in November 2015 to reduce gas dependence after the outbreak of the Russo-Ukrainian war, but instead buys it indirectly from traders in Western Europe as part of the Russian gas that transits through Ukraine. In earlier disputes in 2006 and 2008, Russia stopped gas delivery to the country. In 2009, 80% of the gas from Russia for the European Union was delivered via Ukraine as a transit country.

Domestic production

Domestic production peaked in 1975 at 68.1 billion cubic meters (bcm). Since then production gradually declined, stabilising in recent years at around 20 bcm.

Ukraine aimed to increase natural gas production in the Black Sea from 1 bcm in 2011 to 3 bcm in 2015. In 2012, Black Sea production reached 1.2 bcm and was predicted to rise to 1.65 bcm in 2013.

Ukrainian government plans predicted that by 2030 about half of Ukraine's production will come from non-traditional gas deposits (including 6–11 bcm of shale gas a year).

In 2012, Naftogaz and China Development Bank signed a deal to switch power and chemical production plants from natural gas to coal gasification technologies developed by China in order to reduce reliance on imported gas.

Regions
The oil and gas industry has activities in six regions of Ukraine:
Chernihiv Oblast
Ivano-Frankivsk Oblast
Kharkiv Oblast
Lviv Oblast
Poltava Oblast
Sumy Oblast

Proven reserves

Consumers
Ukraine is a major natural gas consumer, being ranked thirteenth in the world and fifth in Europe. Consumption levels have fallen from 118 bcm in 1991 to less than 55 bcm in 2012, and from 50.4 bcm in 2013 to 29.8 bcm in 2019. Heavy industry is the largest consumer of natural gas in Ukraine (accounting for 40% of domestic consumption), followed by households (over 30%), and communal heating systems for government buildings and residential properties (20%). It is estimated that 9% of gas is wasted.

Naftogaz stated on 17 December 2013 that only four Ukrainian Oblasts (provinces) made regular payments for natural gas.

Ukraine announced on 26 March 2014 that household natural gas prices would rise by 50% from 1 May 2014 in order to receive an IMF $14–18 billion rescue package.

In the first seven months of 2014, gas consumption in Ukraine fell by 15%; this was amidst the Annexation of Crimea by the Russian Federation and the wider Russo-Ukrainian War.

Imports
Despite its own production of natural gas, Ukraine still had to import about 80% of its natural gas needs in 1999. After 2008, the Ukrainian volume of imports of natural gas dropped. According to estimates from 2017, Ukraine domestically supplies 63.8% of its own gas consumption, whereas 36.2% is imported from other countries. Traditionally, Ukraine imported natural gas mainly from Turkmenistan and Russia (about two-thirds of its gas in 2012). Since November 2012, Ukraine has diversified its suppliers of imported natural gas. On 9 January 2014, Ukrainian Energy and Coal Industry Minister Eduard Stavytsky stated that Ukraine (at that time) will buy only Russian natural gas "because it's currently the most profitable".

On 16 June 2014, Russia halted its natural gas supplies to Ukraine because Ukraine refused to pay a debt to Gazprom of $4.5 billion that had arisen after Russia denounced the 2010 Kharkiv Pact on 31 March 2014. In June 2014, Ukraine increased imports of natural gas from Poland and Hungary. Ukraine has not bought gas directly from Russia since 2015, sourcing it instead from traders of the gas which is transported through Ukraine to be sold elsewhere in Europe.

Prices of import
Disputes over gas prices have lead to several economic conflicts with Russia since 1990. After 2004, Russia began to steadily raise the price of its natural gas exports to Ukraine, aiming to bring prices in line with the rates paid by other European states. Until 2005, Ukraine was charged $50 per 1,000 m3; the price rose to $426 per 1,000 m3 in 2012. In January 2013, Ukraine paid $430 per 1,000 m3.

These rapid price increases raised Ukraine's annual cost of gas imports from less than $4 billion in 2005 to $14 billion in 2011 and 2012. Natural gas is Ukraine's biggest import at present and is the main cause of the country's structural trade deficit.

In the 17 December 2013 Ukrainian–Russian action plan, it was agreed that the cost of Russian natural gas supplied to Ukraine would be lowered to $268 per 1,000 cubic metres from a price of more than $400 in December 2013.

During the Russo-Ukrainian War, which started in February 2014 with the Russian military invasion of Crimea, severe tensions extended to the gas sector. The EU commissioner for energy, Günther Oettinger, was called in to broker a deal securing supplies to Ukraine and transit to the EU. The package signed on 30 October 2014 included Russian supplies of gas to Ukraine in the period of November 2014 through March 2015, conditioned on the payment of undisputed Ukrainian gas debt ($3 billion). The price for November and December 2014 was set at $378 per thousand cubic meters, to be adjusted in January. Deliveries were to be prepaid. During that winter Ukrainian monopoly Naftogaz was able to import limited quantities of gas from the EU (reverse flow from Slovakia, Poland, and Hungary) at Central European hub prices, around $250 per thousand cubic meters.
 
In 2014, due to a severe drop in the oil market price (the price halved between the middle and end of the year), Gazprom had to reduce the oil-linked gas price. On 9 January 2014, Naftogaz and Russia's Gazprom signed a supplement to the Russian-Ukrainian gas contract, setting the price of natural gas for Ukraine in the first quarter of 2014 at $268.5 per 1,000 cubic meters.

Reverse flow 
Since the end of gas purchases from the Russian Federation in November 2015, Ukraine has started to purchase natural gas from Poland, Slovakia, and Hungary, and is planning a provisional pipeline from Romania through Moldova. There is no physical reverse flow yet, but a virtual reverse flow (also known as "netting"). Ukraine buys natural gas from international gas traders as part of the volumes that Gazprom sends westwards through Ukraine as transit country.

The Russian Federation has refused to allow the transit of gas sales from Central Asia.

Ukraine as transit route of natural gas

In 2020, Ukraine transited more natural gas than any other country in the world, and it remains the main transit route for Russian natural gas sold to Europe, which earns Ukraine about USD$3 billion per year in transit fees, making it the country's most lucrative export service. Following Russia's launch of the Nord Stream pipeline, which bypasses Ukraine, gas transit volumes have been steadily decreasing. In 2004, more than 120 bcm of Russian gas was transported through Ukraine; this figure dropped to just 84 bcm in 2012.

The Russia–Ukraine gas disputes left many countries with a significant drop in their supplies when Russia cut off all natural gas supplies passing through Ukraine in 2009 and 2006.

Shale gas
Ukraine's largest natural gas fields are about 80–85% depleted, although there are still large quantities of unexploited gas reserves stored in hard-to-reach areas or solid rock. Ukraine has Europe's third largest shale gas reserves, at 1.2 trillion cubic meters (tcm).

There are two potentially large shale gas fields. The Yuzivska gas field located in Donetsk Oblast and Kharkiv Oblast, and the Olesska gas field in Lviv Oblast and Ivano-Frankivsk Oblast. Ukraine signed a 50-year production sharing agreement with Royal Dutch Shell on 25 January 2013 involving the Yuzivska shale gas field. The $10 billion deal was the largest foreign direct investment ever for Ukraine. Full shale gas production was expected to depend on successful results from 15 test wells. On 13 September 2013, Ukrainian Prime Minister Mykola Azarov stated that the (containing all expenditures) price of shale gas will be $120–130 per 1,000 cubic meters. 
On 5 November 2013, Ukraine signed a $10 billion shale gas production-sharing agreement with Chevron Corporation to develop the Olesska gas field. The Ukrainian government projected that the Yuzivska and Olesska projects together could provide Ukraine with an additional 11 to 16 bcm of natural gas per year by 2018. By 2030, a production of 6–11 bcm of shale gas a year is called for in Ukrainian Government plans.

Ukraine originally expected commercial shale gas extraction to begin in 2017, but Shell pulled out of the Yuzivska project in 2015 as a consequence of the war in the Donbas region, located near the field, a collapse in European natural gas prices, and opposition from local residents. Similarly, Chevron abandoned the Olesska project in the West of Ukraine due to increased geopolitical risks and a collapse in European natural gas prices.

Storage 
There is 31 bcm of underground storage in Ukraine.

2022 Russian invasion
Some pipelines in Ukraine were damaged by the 2022 Russian invasion of Ukraine.

See also

Notes

References

External links
Ukraine - Energy Information Administration